The Asia/Oceania Zone is one of the three zones of regional Davis Cup competition in 2010.

In the Asia/Oceania Zone there are four different groups in which teams compete against each other to advance to the next group.

Participating teams

Seeds

Remaining Nations

Draw

 and  relegated to Group III in 2011.
 promoted to Group I in 2011.

First Round Matches

Thailand vs. Pacific Oceania

Indonesia vs. Malaysia

Hong Kong vs. Pakistan

Sri Lanka vs. New Zealand

Second Round Matches

Indonesia vs. Thailand

New Zealand vs. Pakistan

Play-Offs Matches

Malaysia vs. Pacific Oceania

Sri Lanka vs. Hong Kong

Third round

Thailand vs. New Zealand

External links
 Davis Cup draw details

Asia Oceania Zone Group II
Davis Cup Asia/Oceania Zone